Les Amours du dimanche is a 1989 album recorded by French artist Marc Lavoine. It was his third studio album and contains the singles "C'est la vie" (#14), "Ami", "Chère amie" (they failed to chart) "Rue Fontaine" (#11) and "Je n'ai plus rien à te donner" (#18) which obtained popularity in France. The album earned a Gold certification awarded by the SNEP and was ranked on the chart for 26 weeks in 1989 and 1991, peaking at #35 in its first and second weeks.

Track listing
 "C'est la vie" (Marc Lavoine / Fabrice Aboulker) — 3:47
 "Du côté de chez toi" (Marc Lavoine / Fabrice Aboulker) — 4:31
 "Chère amie" (Marc Lavoine / Fabrice Aboulker) — 3:33
 "Rue Fontaine" (Marc Lavoine / Fabrice Aboulker) — 3:33
 "Le Poids de ta peine" (Marc Lavoine / Fabrice Aboulker) — 3:13
 "Les Amours du dimanche", part 1 (Instrumental) (Fabrice Aboulker) — 3:21
 "Je n'ai plus rien à te donner" (Marc Lavoine / Fabrice Aboulker) — 3:52
 "Cent balles de sentiment" (Marc Lavoine / Fabrice Aboulker) — 4:50
 "T'es ma danseuse" (Marc Lavoine / Fabrice Aboulker) — 4:15
 "Ami" (Marc Lavoine / Fabrice Aboulker) — 4:16
 "Les Amours du dimanche", part 2 (Marc Lavoine / Fabrice Aboulker) — 3:51

Source:

Album credits

Fabrice Aboulker – arranger & keyboards
The Astarte Orchestra – strings
Jean-Philippe Bonichon - engineer & mixing (Paris)
Sally Browder - assistant engineer (Los Angeles)
Bill Butt - design for Liaison Internationale
Bill Cuomo – keyboards & synthesizer
Paulinho da Costa – percussion
Richard Groulx – backing vocals
Christopher Hooker – cor anglais
Nick Knight – photography
Abraham Laboriel – bass guitar
Nick Lane – trombone
Basile Leroux – guitar

Steve Madaio – horn arrangement, trumpet
Kate Markowitz – backing vocals
Guida de Palma – backing vocals
Philippe Rault - artistic coordinator
Doug Rider - engineer (Los Angeles)
Patrick Rousseau – percussion
Carole Rowley – backing vocals
Claude Salmiéri – drums
Pascal Stive – arranger, engineer (Paris), keyboards, string engineer (London), synthesizer programming
Jannick Top – bass guitar
Carlos Vega – drums
David Woodford – saxophone
Gavyn Wright – concertmaster

Mixed at Studio Marcadet

Releases

Certifications

Charts

References

1989 albums
Marc Lavoine albums